Jim Ricks is an American and Irish conceptual artist, writer, and curator. He has exhibited throughout Ireland and internationally, including a number of public art projects.

Early life and education

Ricks was born in San Francisco, California. He started painting graffiti in the early 1990s. He studied photography and graduated from the California College of the Arts (2002) and received a Masters from the National University of Ireland, Galway and Burren College of Art programme (2007).

Career

Ricks's work utilises appropriation, institutional critique, politics, and humour. He has had solo shows in the United States, Ireland, the Netherlands, and Mexico.

Ricks was director of 126 Artist-run Gallery from 2007–9, curating a number of shows and organizing exchanges with other artist-run spaces. With Stephanie Syjuco, he created knock-offs of work at the Frieze Art Fair in London, 2009.

In an ongoing body of work, "Jim Ricks has developed the method of synchro-materialism as a means to consider the territory where art meets capitalism", and he has used this methodology in exhibition, performance, and print since 2010. In 2015 he travelled to Afghanistan to make Carpet Bombing, a large traditionally made carpet featuring imagery of military drones – an updated version of Afghan's war rugs. He participated in the 2017 Ghetto Biennale, Port-au-Prince, Haiti.

Public projects

 Poulnabrone Bouncy Dolmen is a large inflatable sculpture designed for people to interact with and play on. It is a twice-the-size replica of a 6,000-year-old megalithic portal tomb, the Poulnabrone Dolmen situated in the Burren, Co. Clare. It traveled to venues around the Aughty Region of County Galway in June 2011 and was a Galway County Council project. Cristín Leach of The Sunday Times wrote: "We need to start thinking more creatively about public art. Jim Ricks has. Poulnabrone Bouncy Dolmen... is a commentary on our past, our present, the concept of “brand Ireland” and the very idea of public art; and everyone is invited to bounce. A temporary, movable, witty, interactive, contemporary public artwork we are all invited to play with? [Alice] Maher has endorsed it as “the best public art piece...ever”. She might just be right." The piece was also shown alongside Jeremy Deller's 2012 inflatable Stonehenge, Sacrilege, in Belfast, and was featured in the Royal Hibernian Academy exhibition Futures 12.
 Ricks is working on the long-term, global public art project In Search of the Truth (or En Busca de la Verdad ). It is a collaboration with Ryan Alexiev, Hank Willis Thomas . The New York Times writes: "The “Truth Booth,” a roving, inflatable creation, in the shape of a cartoon word bubble with "TRUTH" in bold letters on its side, serves as a video confessional. Visitors are asked to sit inside and finish the politically and metaphysically loaded sentence that begins, "The truth is …"". The project has travelled Ireland, Afghanistan, South Africa, Australia, the United States, and Mexico, recording and then exhibiting the thoughts of many people on the subject of truth in several countries.
 Life's a Beach (Art imitates life), Gable end mural responding to the political Murals in Northern Ireland, Abercorn Rd., Derry, Northern Ireland, April 2016
 Sesiones Publicas, San Agustín, La Lisa, Cuba, a LASA project, August 2017.

Museum projects

Ricks was invited to participate in a 2 year project called Sleepwalkers (2012–15) at the Hugh Lane Gallery in Dublin. He was one of six artists invited to use the museum's resources, in an "unusual experiment in exhibition production". Ricks's contributions included a tribute to Richard Hamilton (artist), unauthorized exhibitions, his solo show: Bubblewrap Game: Hugh Lane, 2013 – 14, and a closing event which included James Barry in 2014. Aidan Dunne of the Irish Times describes Ricks's participation as a "curatorial process of selection and validation, making a museum within the museum comprising works from the real collection, artworks borrowed from elsewhere, non-art objects from flea markets and a commissioned copy of an Ed Ruscha painting."

He exhibited at the Trotsky Museum in Mexico City in 2022.

Selected solo exhibitions

2010 – Synchromaterialism, Pallas Contemporary Projects, Dublin, Ireland
2013–2014 – Bubble Wrap Game: The Hugh Lane, Hugh Lane Gallery, Dublin, Ireland
2015 – Alien Invader Super Baby (Synchromaterialism IV) Onomatopee, Eindhoven, The Netherlands
2016–2017 – Centro de Ontología Nacional, Casa Maauad, Mexico City, Mexico
2018 – Museo Ambulante Sebastián, Mexico City, Mexico
2020 – Así Luce la Democracia | This is What Democracy Looks Like, Galeria Daniela Elbahara, Mexico City, Mexico
2021–2022 – El camino a París y Londres pasa por las aldeas de Afganistán, Leon Trotsky Museum, Mexico City

Bibliography
 Ricks, Jim (Editor), Artist-run democracy: sustaining a model, 15 years of 126 gallery, Eindhoven: Onomatopee, 2022. ISBN 9789493148734
 de Búrca, Ella, Michaële Cutaya, Jim Ricks. IRLDADA: 201916. Mexico City: Black Crown Press, 2019.  
Ricks, Jim. Alien Invader Super Baby (Synchromaterialism VI). Eindhoven: Onomatopee, 2018. 
Packer, Matt, Declan Long, and Jim Ricks. "Here Comes The Summer", Derry: Centre for Contemporary Art Derry~Londonderry, 2017.
Bossan, Enrico. 2016 an image of Ireland : contemporary artists from Ireland. Crocetta del Montello: Antiga edizioni, 2016. 
 Edited by Michael Dempsey and Logan Sisley.  Sleepwalkers. Dublin: Hugh Lane Gallery and Ridinghouse, 2015.

See also
 Conceptual art
Appropriation
Post-Internet
Gesamtkunstwerk
Synchromysticism

References

External links
Official website
Shower of Kunst – art writing

Living people
21st-century American artists
American conceptual artists
Artists from California
Irish contemporary artists
Mexican contemporary artists
People from San Francisco
People from Galway (city)
California College of the Arts alumni
Alumni of the University of Galway
Year of birth missing (living people)